Ladislav Tamáš (born 12 August 1953) is a former Slovak football defender who played during his career only for VSS/ZŤS Košice (1972–1981) and he overall played 191 matches and scored one goal at the Czechoslovak First League.

Tamáš made two appearances for the Czechoslovakia national under-21 football team in 1974.

External links
Profile at csfotbal.cz

1953 births
Living people
Slovak footballers
Czechoslovak footballers
Czechoslovakia under-21 international footballers
FC VSS Košice players
Association football defenders